Ludovic Roux (born April 4, 1979) is a former French Nordic combined skier who has  competed since 1996. At the 1998 Winter Olympics in Nagano he won a bronze medal in the 4 x 5 km team event.

Roux married his longtime girlfriend Isabelle Delobel in the summer of 2009. The couple's first child a son, Loïc, was born on October 1, 2009.

References

External links
 
 

1979 births
Living people
French male Nordic combined skiers
Nordic combined skiers at the 1998 Winter Olympics
Nordic combined skiers at the 2002 Winter Olympics
Nordic combined skiers at the 2006 Winter Olympics
Olympic Nordic combined skiers of France
Olympic bronze medalists for France
Olympic medalists in Nordic combined
Medalists at the 1998 Winter Olympics